Ty Masterson (born September 23, 1969) is a Republican member of the Kansas Senate, representing the 16th district since 2009.  From 2005 to 2008, he was a Representative in the Kansas House of Representatives.  He lives in Andover and has served on the Andover City Council. In 2017, the American Conservative Union gave him a lifetime rating of 81%.

Bankruptcy filing
In 2011, Masterson filed for bankruptcy. At the time, he owed Corner Bank $209,000 and Emprise Bank $53,890 in commercial loans and had over $160,000 in revolving credit card debt.

Committee assignments
Masterson serves on these legislative committees:
 Federal and State Affairs
 Public Health and Welfare
 Utilities

Major donors
Some of the top contributors to Masterson's 2008 campaign, according to  OpenSecrets:
 Kansas Republican Senatorial Committee, 4th District Republican Committee, Kansas Chamber of Commerce, Kansas Realtors Association, Kansas Medical Society, Kansas Independent Business PAC, Cox Communications, Wichita Area Business PAC

Financial, insurance and real estate companies were his largest donor groups.

References

External links
Kansas Senate
 Follow the Money campaign contributions
 2006, 2008

1969 births
21st-century American politicians
Conservatism in the United States
Kansas city council members
Republican Party Kansas state senators
Living people
Republican Party members of the Kansas House of Representatives
People from Andover, Kansas
People from El Dorado, Kansas
Presidents of the Kansas Senate